Ray Henderson (born 31 March 1937) is an English former footballer who played as a right winger.

Henderson left Hull for Reading in 1968 and joined the coaching staff there after retirement. By 1975 he was reserve team manager at Everton.

References

External links
Career Stats

1937 births
Living people
English footballers
English football managers
Middlesbrough F.C. players
Hull City A.F.C. players
Reading F.C. players
Halifax Town A.F.C. managers
Southport F.C. managers
Sportspeople from Wallsend
Footballers from Tyne and Wear
Association football wingers